The Sleeping with the Past Tour was a worldwide concert tour by English musician and composer Elton John, in support of his 22nd studio album, Sleeping with the Past. The tour included a total of three legs (North America Leg 1, Oceania and North America Leg 2) and a total of 74 shows.

Tour

Elton John's album, Sleeping with the Past, received lukewarm reviews when the album was released in 1989.

Despite the critical judgment of the album, it became his highest-selling studio album in the United Kingdom, being certified 3× Platinum and spawned his first solo number-one hit in his home country.

During many of these shows, John performed three or four songs from Sleeping with the Past — an unusual move since the new album would not be released until August, and thus audiences were hearing this material for the first time. Also new to the production was a two-minute show intro, conceived and recorded by Davey Johnstone and Guy Babylon, which played as the band walked out on to the stage, using an alternate arrangement of "Bennie and the Jets" to introduce the show's first song. This technique would be used on several subsequent tours and change depending on what song was chosen as the set opener.

On October 18, 1989 in New Haven, Connecticut, he rushed through his performance rarely talking to the  audience. Midway through his concert, he announced he would not perform material from the new album because MCA was not promoting it.

By the time this final leg of the tour would end, John and his band, now with Charlie Morgan on drums, had been on the road almost constantly for two full years. John played 20 dates in six cities in Australia, beginning at the Entertainment Centre in Perth on 27 January 1990, and concluding three weeks later with seven nights at the Sydney Entertainment Centre.

Next came shows in New Zealand on 28 February and 3 March before the tour moved on to America, where he did three shows at the Mark G. Etess Arena in Atlantic City, New Jersey, on 18–20 May. The set list at these US shows featured the premiere of "Made For Me", one of four new songs he had recently recorded for his upcoming box set, To Be Continued...

Two months later, John checked himself in to a Chicago-area hospital for addiction treatment and would not tour again for two years.

Tour dates

1989 setlists

1990 setlists

Tour band
 Elton John – Roland RD-1000 digital piano and lead vocals
 Davey Johnstone – guitars
 Romeo Williams – bass
 Fred Mandel – keyboards/guitar
 Guy Babylon – keyboards
 Jonathan Moffett – drums (North American leg)
 Charlie Morgan – drums (Oceania and second North American leg)
 Mortonette Jenkins – backing vocals
 Marlena Jeter – backing vocals 
 Natalie Jackson – backing vocals

References

External links

 Information Site with Tour Dates

Elton John concert tours
1990 concert tours
1989 concert tours